922 Schlutia (prov. designation:  or ) is a background asteroid from the central regions of the asteroid belt. It was discovered by German astronomer Karl Reinmuth at the Heidelberg Observatory on 18 September 1919. It was named after Edgar Schlubach and Henry Frederic Tiarks, who sponsored an expedition to observe the solar eclipse of 21 September 1922.

Orbit and classification 

Schlutia is a non-family asteroid of the main belt's background population when applying the hierarchical clustering method to its proper orbital elements. It orbits the Sun in the central main-belt at a distance of 2.2–3.2 AU once every 4 years and 5 months (1,611 days; semi-major axis of 2.69 AU). Its orbit has an eccentricity of 0.19 and an inclination of 7° with respect to the ecliptic.

Naming 

This minor planet was named after Edgar Schlubach, a German businessman from Hamburg, as well as Henry Frederic Tiarks, FRAS, British banker and amateur astronomer from London, who together financed the Dutch-German expedition to the Christmas Island to observe the solar eclipse of 21 September 1922. The asteroid was named by Schlubach and Tiarks and published in the journal Astronomische Nachrichten in 1923 (AN 218, 253). The  was also mentioned in The Names of the Minor Planets by Paul Herget in 1955.

Physical characteristics 

Schlutias spectral type has not been determined.

Rotation period 

In August 2007, a rotational lightcurve of Schlutia was obtained from photometric observations by amateur astronomers Pierre Antonini and Silvano Casulli. Lightcurve analysis gave a well-defined rotation period of  hours with a low brightness amplitude of  magnitude, indicative of a regular, spherical shape.

Diameter and albedo 

The Collaborative Asteroid Lightcurve Link assumes an intermediate albedo of 0.1 and calculates a diameter of 16.73 kilometers based on an absolute magnitude of 12.0.

References

External links 
 Lightcurve Database Query (LCDB), at www.minorplanet.info
 Dictionary of Minor Planet Names, Google books
 Asteroids and comets rotation curves, CdR – Geneva Observatory, Raoul Behrend
 Discovery Circumstances: Numbered Minor Planets (1)-(5000) – Minor Planet Center
 
 

000922
Discoveries by Karl Wilhelm Reinmuth
Named minor planets
19190918